UFC 99: The Comeback was a mixed martial arts event held by the Ultimate Fighting Championship (UFC) on June 13, 2009 in Cologne, Germany.

Background
This event was the first UFC event held in Germany, as well as the first in mainland Europe (events have previously been held in the United Kingdom, Ireland, Canada, the continental United States, Brazil, and Japan).

On Monday, June 1, the UFC announced that Mirko Cro Cop would be returning to the promotion to face Mostapha al-Turk at UFC 99. It was Cro Cop's first fight in the UFC since his unanimous-decision loss to Cheick Kongo at UFC 75 in 2007.

An announced bout between Heath Herring and Cain Velasquez was cancelled due to an illness that Herring was suffering. On May 20, 2009, Cheick Kongo was announced as the replacement.

Results

Bonus awards
Fighters were awarded $60,000 bonuses.

Fight of the Night: Rich Franklin vs. Wanderlei Silva
Knockout of the Night: Mike Swick
Submission of the Night: Terry Etim

See also
 Ultimate Fighting Championship
 List of UFC champions
 List of UFC events
 2009 in UFC

References

External links
UFC99 Official Website

Ultimate Fighting Championship events
2009 in mixed martial arts
Mixed martial arts in Germany
Sport in Cologne
2009 in German sport